Lance Naik  Yazdan Khan Hazara (born 1880s) was a Lance naik from Baluchistan, British India (Today Pakistan) from 1906 until 1926. He served in the 106th Hazara Pioneers during World War I.

He was not amongst the fugitive warring tribe of Hazara and belonged to the Afghani Hazara Jaghuri sub tribe Oqi]]. He migrated from sangi masha jaghuri to Quetta in the year 1908 and joined British army and was dismissed from his service in the year 1926 by captain Ali Dost incharge Hazara Pioneer. He was the father of General Muhammad Musa Khan Hazara who was Chief of Staff for the Pakistan Armed Forces.

See also 
 List of Hazara people

References 

Hazara politicians
Hazara military personnel
Pakistani people of Hazara descent
British Indian Army soldiers